The Neilson–Terry Guild of Dramatic Art was a drama school at 17 Cavendish Square in London. In the 1930s it was run by the actress and playwright, Louise Regnis. Students included playwright Elizabeth FitzRoy, Kirsten Forssmann, Mary Joan (Mollie) Hammond, and Marjorie Johnstone. During World War II most of the school went to Bath, and the company was finally shut down in 1948.

See also
 Julia Neilson
 Fred Terry
 Phyllis Neilson-Terry
 Terry family

References

Drama schools in London